NRL Victoria (abbreviated as NRLVic, and formerly the Victorian Rugby League) is responsible for administering the game of rugby league in the Australian state of Victoria. Victoria is an Affiliated State of the overall Australian governing body the National Rugby League. The VRL commenced in 1952 and has been running each year since. 

NRL Victoria solely administers the Storm Premiership in Melbourne, the Sunraysia-Riverlands Rugby League, and the Murray Cup Rugby League competitions. It also jointly administers the Limestone Coast Rugby League with NRL South Australia.

Prior to 2013 NRL Victoria was known as the Victorian Rugby League before the NRL completed a full rebranding exercise and renamed all affiliate states.

Over the years the VRL have produced a number of juniors for the Melbourne Storm, SG Ball, NYC and NRL teams.

Storm Premiership

The Melbourne Rugby League has been running since the 1950s. RAAF Ballarat were the inaugural premiers with the Truganina Rabbitohs being the most recent in 2022. The competition was rebranded in 2022 to become the Storm Premiership, aligning with the strong Storm identity for Rugby League in Victoria.

Melbourne Rugby League Clubs

Defunct Clubs

Sunraysia-Riverlands Rugby League

Clubs
The Sunraysia-Riverlands Rugby League is a rugby league competition held in North-Western Victoria.

Former Clubs

Murray Cup 

The Murray Cup is a rugby league competition on the border of Victoria and New South Wales. Initially the competition was established in 1998 as the Goulburn Murray Rugby League by the Country Rugby League and the Victorian Rugby League. The league was disbanded in 2009 before being re-established as the Murray Cup in 2015. As of 2022 there is a competition for both Senior Men's and Women's Tag football.

Current Clubs 
There are currently seven clubs affiliated with the Murray Cup competition.

Former Teams

Limestone Coast Rugby League 

The Limestone Coast Rugby League is a rugby league competition held in the Wimmera and South West regions of Victoria and Eastern South Australia. The competition is co-administered by NRL SA and NRL Victoria, and features five clubs (three from Victoria and two from South Australia).

Clubs

Former Clubs

Former Competitions

Central Highlands Rugby League

The Central Highlands Rugby League (CHRL) was a rugby league competition in western Victoria. It covered an area centred on Ballarat, stretching north to Creswick, south to Warrnambool, east to Bacchus Marsh, and west to Horsham.

The CHRL competition started with two junior age levels but in 2008 due to the 11-year drought finally taking its toll on Central Victoria the council deemed the sports grounds used in the competition too dangerous for use. This temporarily ended competition for the CHRL (and some clubs in other sports too). After another two years of the fields not being used the councils re-allocated the fields to other purposes, ending the ability for clubs in the CHRL to continue until new home grounds are established.

Former Central Highlands Rugby League Clubs

Proposed Clubs 

NRL Victoria are currently looking for opportunities for Rugby League in this region.

Victoria Rugby League Notable Juniors
Altona Roosters
 Jeremy Smith
 Gareth Widdop
 Charnze Nicoll-Klokstad
 Kurt Bernard
 Charnze Nicoll-Klokstad
 Ben Nakubuwai
 Tony Tumusa
 Jamayne Taunoa-Brown
 Shae Ah-Fook
 Troy Hanita-Paki (u20s)
Casey Warriors
 Kelma Tuilagi
North West Wolves
 Greg Marzhew
Northern Thunder
 Young Tonumaipea
 Richard Kennar 
South Eastern Titans
 Mahe Fonua
Francis Tualau
Waverley Oakleigh Panthers
 Drury Low
 Denny Solomona 
 Pride Petterson-Robati
 Jarred Muller-Dobbe
 Kalin Ropata
 Trent Toelau (u20s)
Sunbury Tigers 
Dean Ieremia
Fonua Pole
Casey Warriors
Connor Donehue

See also

 Rugby league in Victoria

References

External links

 Central Highlands Rugby League official site
 Goulburn Murray Rugby League official site
 Rugby League clubs in Victoria

Rugby league competitions in Australia
Rugby league governing bodies in Australia
Rugby league in Victoria (Australia)
Sport in Melbourne
Rug